Gersz is a given name. Notable people with the name include:

Gersz Salwe (1862–1920), Polish chess player
Gersz Rotlewi (1889–1920), Polish chess player

See also
Gersh (disambiguation)
Qirsh
Georg (given name)
George (given name)